Biathlon at the 1988 Winter Paralympics consisted of three events for men.

Medal table

Medal summary 
The competition event was:
7.5 km: men

The event had separate standing classifications:

LW2 - standing: single leg amputation above the knee
LW4 - standing: single leg amputation below the knee
LW6/8 - standing: single arm amputation

See also
Biathlon at the 1988 Winter Olympics

References 

 

 Winter Sport Classification, Canadian Paralympic Committee

1988 Winter Paralympics events
1988
Paralympics
Biathlon competitions in Austria